The Rt Rev Robert Thomas Hearn was the 9th Bishop of Cork, Cloyne and Ross. Educated at Trinity College, Dublin,  he was  ordained in 1900. His first post was a  curacy at Youghal after which he was  Vicar of Shandon where his wife Mary Hearn was a gynaecologist. in 1926 he became Archdeacon of Cork then its Diocesan Bishop. He died in post on 14 July 1952.

Notes

1875 births
1952 deaths
Alumni of Trinity College Dublin
Archdeacons of Cork
20th-century Anglican bishops in Ireland
Bishops of Cork, Cloyne and Ross